The Women's Chess Olympiad is an event held by FIDE (the International Chess Federation) since 1957 (every two years since 1972), where national women's teams compete at chess for gold, silver and bronze medals. Since 1976 the Women's Chess Olympiad has been incorporated within Chess Olympiad events, with simultaneous women's and open tournaments.

The Soviet Union has won it the most often: 11 times. Since the break-up of the Soviet Union, China have won the event six times, Georgia – four times, Russia – three times and Ukraine – two times. It has also been won by Hungary led by three Polgár sisters (twice) and Israeli team fully composed of Soviet-born players (once in 1976 when it was boycotted by the Eastern Bloc).

Results

From 1957 to 1974 the Women's Olympiad was a separate event (with except of the 1972 event). Since 1976 it has been held in the same place and at the same time as the open event.

* In 1976 the Soviet Union and other Socialist states did not compete for political reasons.

Total team ranking
The table contains the women's teams ranked by the medals won at the Chess Olympiad, not including the unofficial events, ranked by the number of first place medals, ties broken by second-place medals, etc.

Most successful players
Boldface denotes active chess players and highest medal count among all players (including these who not included in these tables) per type.

Multiple team champions

Multiple team medalists
The table shows players who have won at least 6 team medals in total at the Chess Olympiads.

Best individual results in the women's section
The best individual results in order of overall percentage are:

Notes
 Only players participating in at least four Olympiads are included in this table.
 Medals indicated in the order gold - silver - bronze. The statistics of individual medals includes only medals which are awarding to the top three individual players on each board. The medals for overall performance rating (awarded in 1984–2006) are not included into this statistics, but are listed separately below the table.
 Nona Gaprindashvili played eleven Olympiads for the Soviet Union, and one for Georgia. She won another one individual gold medal and one individual bronze medal for overall performance rating. In total she won 9 gold, 3 silver and 1 bronze individual medals.
 Pia Cramling won another one individual silver medal and one individual bronze medal for overall performance rating. In total she won 3 gold, 3 silver and 3 bronze individual medals.
 Zsófia Polgár won another one individual gold medal for overall performance rating. In total she won 3 gold and 1 bronze individual medals.
 Ketevan Arakhamia-Grant played her first Olympiad for the Soviet Union, then four for Georgia and three for Scotland. She won another one individual gold medal and one individual bronze medal for overall performance rating. In total she won 3 gold and 2 bronze individual medals.
 Wang Lei won another one individual gold medal for overall performance rating. In total she won 2 individual gold medals.
 Zsuzsa Polgár played three Olympiads for Hungary, and one for the United States (as Susan Polgar). She won another one individual gold medal and two individual bronze medals for overall performance rating. In total she won 2 gold, 2 silver and 3 bronze individual medals.
 Alisa Galliamova played her first Olympiad for the Soviet Union, then one for Ukraine (as Galliamova-Ivanchuk) and three for Russia. She won another two individual silver medals for overall performance rating. In total she won 4 individual silver medals.
 Zhao Xue won another two individual gold medals and one individual bronze medal for overall performance rating. In total she won 5 gold and 1 bronze individual medals.
 Maia Chiburdanidze played her first seven Olympiads for the Soviet Union, the rest for Georgia. She won another one individual gold medal and three individual bronze medals for overall performance rating. In total she won 5 gold, 2 silver and 6 bronze individual medals.
 Hou Yifan won another one individual bronze medal for overall performance rating. In total she won 1 gold, 3 silver and 3 bronze individual medals.
 Nana Ioseliani played her first two Olympiads for the Soviet Union, the rest for Georgia. She won another one individual silver medal and one individual bronze medal for overall performance rating. In total she won 2 gold, 3 silver and 2 bronze individual medals.
 Zhu Chen won another two individual gold medals for overall performance rating. In total she won 4 gold and 1 silver individual medals.

See also

Chess Olympiad
Correspondence Chess Olympiad
European Chess Club Cup
European Team Chess Championship
Mind Sports Organisation
Russia (USSR) vs Rest of the World
Women's World Chess Championship
World Chess Championship
World Mind Sports Games
World Team Chess Championship

External links
 http://www.olimpbase.org/index.html?http%3A%2F%2Fwww.olimpbase.org%2Folympiads%2Fwomen_results.html

Women's Chess Olympiad
Olympiad
 
Recurring sporting events established in 1957
Biennial sporting events